The 2014 European Ladies' Team Championship took place 8–12 July at Diners CUBO Golf Course in Ljubljana, Slovenia. It was the 31st women's golf amateur European Ladies' Team Championship.

Venue 
The course, located in Smlednik, in flat terrain without trees on the course, 12 kilometres north-east of the city center of Ljubljana, Slovenia, was designed by architect Peter Škofic and opened with 18 holes in 2009.

The course had previously hosted the 2012 individual European Ladies Amateur Championship.

The championship course was set up with par 71.

Format 
All participating teams played two qualification rounds of stroke-play with six players, counted the five best scores for each team.

The eight best teams formed flight A, in knock-out match-play over the next three days. The teams were seeded based on their positions after the stroke-play. The first placed team was drawn to play the quarter final against the eight placed team, the second against the seventh, the third against the sixth and the fourth against the fifth. In each match between two nation teams, two 18-hole foursome games and five 18-hole single games were played. Teams were allowed to switch players during the team matches, selecting other players in to the afternoon single games after the morning foursome games. Teams knocked out after the quarter finals played one foursome game and four single games in each of their remaining matches. Games all square after 18 holes were declared halved, if the team match was already decided.

The eight teams placed 9–16 in the qualification stroke-play formed flight B, to play similar knock-out match-play, with one foursome game and four single games, to decide their final positions.

The four teams placed 17–20 in the qualification stroke-play formed flight C, to meet each other, with one foursome game and four single games, to decide their final positions.

Teams 
20 nation teams contested the event. Each team consisted of six players. Turkey took part for the first time.

Players in the leading teams and home team

Other participating teams

Winners 
Eight times champions England lead  the opening 36-hole qualifying competition, with a score of 7 under par 703, six strokes ahead of team Sweden.

Individual leader in the 36-hole stroke-play competition was Hayley Davis, England, with a score of 8 under par 134, three strokes ahead of nearest competitors.

Team France won the championship, beating Finland 4–2 in the final and earned their seventh title.

Switzerland earned third place, beating England 4–3 in the bronze match.

Results 
Qualification round

Team standings

* Note: In the event of a tie the order was determined by the better total non-counting scores.

Individual leaders

 Note: There was no official award for the lowest individual score.

Flight A

Bracket

Final games

* Note: Game declared halved, since team match already decided.

Flight B

Bracket

Flight C

Team matches

Team standings

Final standings

Sources:

See also 
 Espirito Santo Trophy – biennial world amateur team golf championship for women organized by the International Golf Federation.
 European Amateur Team Championship – European amateur team golf championship for men organised by the European Golf Association.
 European Ladies Amateur Championship – European amateur individual golf championship for women organised by the European Golf Association.

References

External links 
 European Golf Association: Results

European Ladies' Team Championship
Golf tournaments in Slovenia
European Ladies' Team Championship
European Ladies' Team Championship
European Ladies' Team Championship